United States gubernatorial elections were held in 1938, in 33 states, concurrent with the House and Senate elections, on November 8, 1938 (September 12 in Maine).

Governor Herbert H. Lehman was only able to win reelection due to the votes he received on the American Labor Party's ballot line. In New York, the governor was elected to a 4-year term for the first time, instead of a 2-year term.

Results

See also 
1938 United States elections
1938 United States Senate elections
1938 United States House of Representatives elections

References 

 
November 1938 events